Ariel Miranda Gil (born January 10, 1989) is a Cuban professional baseball pitcher for the Saraperos de Saltillo of the Mexican League. He has played in Major League Baseball (MLB) for the Baltimore Orioles and Seattle Mariners, Nippon Professional Baseball (NPB) for the Fukuoka SoftBank Hawks, the Chinese Professional Baseball League (CPBL) for the Chinatrust Brothers, and the KBO League for the Doosan Bears.

Career
Miranda played in the Cuban National Series from 2007 to 2013. He defected from Cuba to pursue a career in Major League Baseball (MLB).

Baltimore Orioles

On May 23, 2015, Miranda signed a minor league deal with the Baltimore Orioles on May 23, 2015. He made his major league debut for the Orioles on July 3 against the Seattle Mariners, pitching 2 innings of relief giving up 3 runs off 4 hits and striking out 4.

Seattle Mariners
On July 31, 2016, the Orioles traded Miranda to the Seattle Mariners for Wade Miley. The 2017 Mariners roster was crippled by player injuries, specifically to the starting rotation, and Miranda was one of the only starters to consistently stay in the rotation without injuring himself or being sent down. On June 4, Miranda pitched his first complete game, a 7-1 win against the Tampa Bay Rays. For the season, he finished with a record of 8-7 in 31 games, 29 starts for the Mariners. He allowed 37 home runs in 160 innings pitched while striking out 137.

Miranda was released by the Mariners on July 4, 2018.

Fukuoka SoftBank Hawks 
On July 17, 2018, he signed with the Fukuoka SoftBank Hawks of Nippon Professional Baseball. On August 18, he pitched  against the Orix Buffaloes as a starting pitcher, and won the game for the first time in the Pacific League. In the 2018 season, he finished the regular season with 5 games pitched, a 6–1 win–loss record, a 1.89 ERA, and 40 strikeouts in 47 2/3 innings. On October 30, he pitched against the Hiroshima Toyo Carp as a starting pitcher, and won the game in the 2018 Japan Series.

In the 2019 season, Miranda finished the regular season with 18 games pitched, a 7–5 win–loss record, a 4.19 ERA, one save, and 58 strikeouts in 86 innings. And he was selected to the Japan Series roster in the 2019 Japan Series. On November 28, Fukuoka SoftBank Hawks announced that team will not sign with Miranda for next season. On December 2, 2019, he became a free agent.

Chinatrust Brothers 
On January 7, 2020, Miranda signed with the Chinatrust Brothers of the Chinese Professional Baseball League.

Doosan Bears 
On December 23, 2020, Miranda signed a one-year deal with the Doosan Bears that will be worth up to $800,000. On October 24, 2021, Miranda struck out Hong Chang-ki of the LG Twins to record his 224th strikeout of the season. This surpassed the 37-year-old KBO strikeout record previously held by Choi Dong-won. Miranda finished the season with 225 total strikeouts, and won the Choi Dong-won Award as the league's best pitcher for the 2021 KBO League season. Miranda led the KBO with a 2.33 ERA and 225 strikeouts, both setting new single-season records. He won the KBO League Most Valuable Player Award and the Choi Dong-won Award, presented annually to the top pitcher in South Korea, earlier this month.

On December 24, 2021, Miranda re-signed with the Bears for the 2022 season on a one-year, $1.9 million deal. He was released by the team on July 13, 2022 after suffering a shoulder injury.

Saraperos de Saltillo
On March 13, 2023, Miranda signed with the Saraperos de Saltillo of the Mexican League.

References

External links

NPB.jp

1989 births
Living people
Baltimore Orioles players
Bowie Baysox players
CTBC Brothers players
Defecting Cuban baseball players
Doosan Bears players
Frederick Keys players
Fukuoka SoftBank Hawks players
Gulf Coast Orioles players
Industriales de La Habana players
Isla de la Juventud players
Major League Baseball pitchers
Major League Baseball players from Cuba
Cuban expatriate baseball players in the United States
Modesto Nuts players
Nippon Professional Baseball pitchers
Norfolk Tides players
Baseball players from Havana
Seattle Mariners players
Tacoma Rainiers players
Vaqueros de la Habana players
Cuban expatriate baseball players in South Korea
Cuban expatriate baseball players in Taiwan
Cuban expatriate baseball players in Japan